Mehmet Recep Peker (5 February 1889 – 1 April 1950) was a Turkish military officer and politician. He served in various ministerial posts and finally as the Prime Minister of Turkey. He self-identified as a Fascist and was critical of Islam.

Early life 
Born in Istanbul on 5 February 1889, his father was named Mustafa and was of Lezgi descent, migrated to Anatolia from the Dagestan region of the Caucasus.

He studied at the Military College following his graduation from the Kuleli Military High School, where he enrolled after completing his primary and secondary education at Koca Mustafa Pasha Primary School and Military Middle School. After finishing the academy in the rank of a lieutenant in 1907, he was assigned to the staff officer class.

Recep Peker took part at the battles of Yemen and Libya, Balkan Wars, Thrace and Caucasus campaigns of the World War I. He graduated in 1919, as the first of his class, from the Staff College to which he entered in 1911.

At the second half of 1919, he served as assistant teacher of history of war at the Military Academy. He joined on 4 February 1920, the Turkish War of Independence in Anatolia as a squadron leader.

Politics
He was appointed secretary general of the Grand National Assembly of Turkey on 23 April 1920, the day the parliament was opened. He served in this position more than three years.

In the time between his appointment as the parliament's secretary general until the Battle of Sakarya, he served in addition as the chief of Second Branch Office at the General Staff. On 12 July 1923, he was re-elected into the parliament as the deputy from Kütahya.

He was the Minister of Finance between 6 March and 22 November 1924, and Minister of Interior and on commission the Minister of Barter and Minister of Development and Housing. Peker was appointed as the Minister of National Defence on 4 March 1926, and the Minister of Public Works in 1927. He was elected the parliamentary group spokesman and secretary general of the Republican People's Party (CHP) in 1928.

Recep Peker initiated the introduction of the "History of the Revolution" in the school curricula. He taught Republican Ideology at universities in Ankara and Istanbul in the academic year 1933-1934. His classes were known as revolution lessons (İnkılap Dersleri). He wrote a book about it. He supported the idea that women should be liberated from the sack (the veil) and that the Arabic alphabet should be replaced by a Latin based alphabet.

On 17 August 1942, he was appointed Minister of Interior in the cabinet of Şükrü Saracoğlu serving nine months. Recep Peker became the first prime minister of the multi-party period on 7 August 1946, however Peker was a strong advocate of statism and the authoritarian one-party state. As prime minister, he opposed democratization and the introduction of the multi-party system. He served in this position until 7 September 1947. In 1948, he retired from political life.

Recep Peker died on 2 April 1950, and was laid to rest at the Edirnekapı Martyr's Cemetery in Istanbul.

References

 Ministry of Culture and Tourism, the General Directorate of Cultural Heritages and Museums

1889 births
1950 deaths
20th-century prime ministers of Turkey
Military personnel from Istanbul
Turkish people of Lezgian descent
Ottoman Military Academy alumni
Ottoman Military College alumni
Ottoman Army officers
Republican People's Party (Turkey) politicians
Prime Ministers of Turkey
Government ministers of Turkey
Ministers of National Defence of Turkey
Turkish Army officers
Burials at Edirnekapı Martyr's Cemetery
Ministers of Finance of Turkey
Ministers of National Education of Turkey
Ministers of the Interior of Turkey
Deputies of Istanbul
Ministers of Public Works of Turkey
Members of the 2nd government of Turkey
Members of the 3rd government of Turkey
Members of the 4th government of Turkey
Members of the 5th government of Turkey
Members of the 13th government of Turkey
Members of the 14th government of Turkey
Members of the 15th government of Turkey
Members of the 2nd Parliament of Turkey
Turkish people of Circassian descent